Rebelution may refer to:

The Rebelution, a Christian movement
Rebelution (band), a reggae band from Santa Barbara, California
Rebelution (Rebelution album)
Pitbull Starring in Rebelution, 2009
Rebelution (Tanya Stephens album), 2006